Blepharophyma is chronic swelling of eyelids, mainly due to sebaceous gland hyperplasia.

See also
 List of cutaneous conditions
 Phymas in rosacea

References

Acneiform eruptions